Giovanni Maria Camilleri (15 March 1843 – 7 November 1924) was a Maltese prelate who became the fourth bishop of Gozo.

Life
Camilleri was born in Valletta, Malta on March 15, 1843. At the age of 24 he was ordained priest of the Order of St Augustine. On February 11, 1889 Pope Leo XIII appointed Camilleri to the vacant see of Gozo to succeed Pietro Pace who was appointed as bishop of Malta. He was consecrated on February 24, 1889 by Cardinal Mariano Rampolla in the Basilica of Sant'Agostino in Rome. On May 12 he was installed as the fourth bishop of Gozo in the cathedral of the diocese. On January 21, 1924 Pope Pius XI accepted the resignation of Bishop Camilleri as bishop of Gozo and was appointed as Titular Bishop of Methone. Ten months later, on November 7, Camilleri died in Rabat, Malta at the age of 81.

See also
Catholic Church in Malta

References

1843 births
1924 deaths
19th-century Roman Catholic bishops in Malta
20th-century Roman Catholic bishops in Malta
People from Valletta
Roman Catholic bishops of Gozo